This is a comprehensive list of crowd figures for Australian football codes in 2007. It includes several different competitions and matches from the following football codes: Australian rules football, rugby league, football (soccer) and rugby union.

Included Competitions

National Competitions
Several football codes have national (domestic) competitions in Australia, the following are taken into consideration:

The 2007 Australian Football League season (AFL)
The 2007 National Rugby League season (NRL)
The 2007–08 A-League season (A-L)
The 2007 Australian Rugby Championship (ARC)

Two of these leagues, specifically the NRL and A-League, have one team in New Zealand. Attendance figures for the New Zealand teams are taken into account in the figures on this page.

Other competitions
Other competitions, such as international and representative competitions, included are:

The 2007 Tri Nations Series (Tri Nat) 
The 2007 Rugby League State of Origin series (SoO)
The 2007 Super 14 season
The 2007 Asian Champions League (ACL)

Note: For these competitions, only figures for games that take place in Australia are taken into account

Non-Competition Games
Some non-competition matches (such as friendly and exhibition matches) are also included:

Sydney FC's Hyundai Club Challenge exhibition match against the Los Angeles Galaxy
Home matches played by the Australia national football (soccer) team, the Socceroos, in 2007
Home test matches played by the Australia national rugby union team, the Wallabies, in 2007.
Home test matches played by the Australia national rugby league team, the Kangaroos (RL), in 2007.

Attendances by Code
In order to directly compare sports, the total attendances for each major code are listed here. The colour-coding of the different codes is used throughout the article.

 Crowds for Australian rules football include the AFL regular season as well as AFL finals games.
 Crowds for rugby league include the NRL regular season and finals, State of Origin matches and Test Matches played by the Kangaroos.
 Association football (soccer) attendances include A-League regular season games, Asian Champions league games, Socceroos games and Sydney FC's exhibition game against the Los Angeles Galaxy.
 Rugby union attendances include games from the Super 14 and Australian Rugby Championship as well as Wallabies Internationals (including games in the Tri Nations and Test Matches).

Attendances by Competition
Some codes have multiple competitions, several competitions are compared here.

 The "Regular Season" is also known as the "Home and Away Season", "Premiership season" or may consist of main competition matches.
 AFL crowds totalled 7,050,945. This is 674,711 more than 2006 (an increase of 9.57%) 
 NRL crowds totalled 3,331,994. This is 216,293 more than 2006 (an increase of 6.49%)

Attendances by Team
Attendances that specific teams pull for their home games are listed here.

Teams are listed by competition – generally only 'regular season' games are included.
The Socceroos are Australia's national Association football (soccer) team, The Wallabies are Australia's national rugby union team and the Kangaroos (RL) are Australia's national rugby league team – their nicknames are used to avoid confusion

Attendances by Match
Attendances for single matches are listed here. Note that not all matches are necessarily included.

See also
2006 Australian football code crowds
Australian rules football attendance records
Sports attendance

External links
 Official Website of the Australian Football League
 National Rugby League
 A-League Official website
 Asian Champions League Official website

Note: Sources for this Article are from Wikipedia related articles regarding the included competitions and teams.

2007 in Australian rugby league
2007 in Australian rugby union
2007 in Australian soccer
2007 in Australian rules football
2007